Hjalmar-Johannes Mäe ( in  Tuhala, Kreis Harrien, Governorate of Estonia, Russian Empire – 10 April 1978 in Graz, Austria) was an Estonian politician.

Mäe was twice a candidate to the Riigikogu, in the 1929 Estonian parliamentary election as a Landlords' Party candidate and in the 1932 Estonian parliamentary election as a National Centre Party candidate. Later he joined the Vaps Movement. He was the Head of the Directorate of the Estonian Self-Administration, which was subordinate to Reichskommissariat Ostland, during the occupation of Estonia by Nazi Germany, and took part in the first investigation of the Nemmersdorf massacre.

References

1901 births
1978 deaths
People from Kose Parish
People from Kreis Harrien
Landlords' Party politicians
National Centre Party (Estonia) politicians
Members of the Vaps Movement
Estonian Self-Administration
People of Generalbezirk Estland
Estonian emigrants to Austria